The history of Burgundy stretches back to the times when the region was inhabited in turn by Celts, Romans (Gallo-Romans), and in the 5th century, the Roman allies the Burgundians, a Germanic people perhaps originating in Bornholm (Baltic Sea), who settled there and established the Kingdom of the Burgundians.

This Burgundian kingdom was conquered in the 6th century by another Germanic tribe, the Franks, who continued the kingdom of Burgundy under their own rule.

Later, the region was divided between the Duchy of Burgundy (to the west) and the County of Burgundy (to the east). The Duchy of Burgundy is the better-known of the two, later becoming the French province of Burgundy, while the County of Burgundy became the French province of Franche-Comté, literally meaning free county.

The situation is complicated by the fact that at different times and under different geopolitical circumstances, many different entities have gone by the name of 'Burgundy'. Historian Norman Davies has commented that "[f]ew subjects in European history have created more havoc than that summarized by the phrase 'all the Burgundies'." In 1862, James Bryce compiled a list of ten such entities, a list which Davies himself extends to fifteen, ranging from the first Burgundian kingdom founded by Gunther in the fifth century, to the modern French région of Burgundy.

History

The Burgundians, who migrated into the Western Roman Empire as it collapsed, are generally regarded as a Germanic people, possibly originating in Bornholm (modern Denmark). (A fringe theory suggests that the Burgundians may have been the Βουρουγουνδοι Bourougoundoi later alluded to by the Aeolian historian Agathias, as a component of Eurasian steppe peoples, namely the "Scythian or Huns" and, by implication, Turkic peoples like the Bulgars). While they were dominated by the Huns for a time and adopted some of their cultural practices, Agathias may have confused or conflated the Burgundians with the Lombards, who apparently had more significant ties to the Huns and Bulgars.

In 411, the Burgundians crossed the Rhine and established a kingdom at Worms. Amidst repeated clashes between the Romans and Huns, the Burgundian kingdom eventually occupied what is today the borderlands between Switzerland, France, and Italy. In 534, the Franks defeated Godomar, the last Burgundian king, and absorbed the territory into their growing empire.

During and after the dissolution of the Frankish Empire a number of polities existed at different times and covering different areas. During the late 9th century there were three Burgundies: 
the Kingdom of Upper (Transjurane) Burgundy around Lake Geneva,
the Kingdom of Lower Burgundy in Provence,
the Duchy of Burgundy west of the Saône.
The two kingdoms of Upper and Lower Burgundy were reunited in 933 as the Kingdom of Burgundy. This kingdom in turn was absorbed into the Holy Roman Empire under Conrad II in 1032, and known from the 12th century as the Kingdom of Arles. 
The Duchy of Burgundy was annexed by the French throne in 1004.

During the Middle Ages, Burgundy was the seat of some of the most important Western churches and monasteries, among them Cluny, Cîteaux, and Vézelay.

During the 12th and 13th centuries, the County of Burgundy emerged from the area previously within the Kingdom of Upper Burgundy. It became known as the Free County of Burgundy or Franche-Comté.

During the Hundred Years' War, King John II of France gave the duchy to his youngest son, Philip the Bold, rather than leaving it for his successor on the French throne. Following a personal union between the Duchy and the County of Burgundy, the "Two Burgundies" soon became a major rival to the French throne. The Dukes of Burgundy succeeded in assembling an empire stretching from Switzerland to the North Sea, in large part by marriage. This Burgundian State consisted of a number of fiefdoms on both sides of the (then largely symbolic) border between the Kingdom of France and the Holy Roman Empire. Its economic heartland was in the Low Countries, particularly Flanders and Brabant. The Burgundian court outshone the French court both economically and culturally. In Belgium and in the south of the Netherlands, the expression "Burgundian lifestyle" is still used to denote enjoyment of life, good food, and extravagant spectacle.

In 1477, at the battle of Nancy during the Burgundian Wars, the last duke Charles the Bold was killed in battle, and the Duchy itself was annexed by France. In the late 15th and early 16th centuries, the other Burgundian territories provided a power base for the rise of the Habsburgs, after Maximilian of Austria married the surviving daughter of the ducal family, Mary. After her death, her husband moved his court first to Mechelen and later to the palace at Coudenberg, Brussels, and from there ruled the remnants of the empire, the Low Countries (Burgundian Netherlands) and Franche-Comté, then still an imperial fief. The latter territory was ceded to France in the Treaty of Nijmegen of 1678.

With the French Revolution in the end of the 18th century, the administrative units of the regions disappeared, but were reconstituted during the Fifth Republic in the 1970s. The modern-day administrative région includes most of the former duchy.

See also
 Burgundian State
 List of chancellors of Burgundy
 Burgundian Netherlands
 Count of Burgundy
 County of Burgundy
 Duchy of Burgundy
 Duke of Burgundy
 French wine
 Kingdom of Burgundy
 King of Burgundy
 House of Burgundy
 Timeline of Dijon
 Burgundian Circle
 Spanish Road
 Middle Francia
 Blue Banana

References

External links

  
 Burgundy in the 1913 Catholic Encyclopedia at BibleWiki
 Burgundy in the 1913 Catholic Encyclopedia at NewAdvent.org
  Burgundy Tourism
 Départements, arrondissements & cantons of Burgundy (INSEE site)
  Netbourgogne, site sur la Bourgogne